Søren Estrup Alfred Lind (27 March 1879 – 29 April 1959) was a Danish cinematographer, screenwriter, and film director of the silent era. Lind was a prominent director in early Scandinavian cinema, and also worked in the German film industry. He is believed to have shot the earliest surviving footage of Iceland from 1906.

Selected filmography

Director
 The White Slave Trade (1910)
 The Masque of Life (1915–1916)
 Alkohol (1919)
 Tragedy at the Royal Circus (1928)
 Girls Do Not Joke (1929)

Cinematographer
 The Abyss (1910)
 Four Devils (1911)
 The Masque of Life (1915–1916)

References

Bibliography
 Aitken, Ian. The Concise Routledge Encyclopedia of the Documentary Film. Routledge, 2011.
 Abel, Richard. Encyclopedia of Early Cinema. Taylor & Francis, 2005.
 Bock, Hans-Michael & Bergfelder, Tim. The Concise CineGraph. Encyclopedia of German Cinema. Berghahn Books, 2009.

External links

1879 births
1959 deaths
Danish cinematographers
Danish film directors
Danish male screenwriters
People from Helsingør
20th-century screenwriters